The Department of Education is a department of the Government of Ireland. It is led by the Minister for Education.

Departmental team
The official headquarters and ministerial offices of the department are at Marlborough Street, Dublin. The departmental team consists of the following:
Minister for Education: Norma Foley, TD
Minister of State for Special Education and Inclusion: Josepha Madigan, TD
Secretary General: Bernie McNally

Overview
The mission of the Department of Education is to provide high-quality education which will enable individuals to achieve their full potential and to participate fully as members of society, and contribute to Ireland's social, cultural and economic development. Chief among the department's priorities are:

the promotion of equity and inclusion, quality outcomes and lifelong learning
planning for education that is relevant to personal, social, cultural and economic needs
enhancement of the capacity of the department for service delivery, policy formulation, research and evaluation

History
In the revolutionary period, the position was first established as the Minister for Irish. This was expanded as the Secretary for Education in the Government of the 2nd Dáil. It was provided a statutory basis by the Ministers and Secretaries Act 1924, passed soon after the establishment of the Irish Free State in 1922. This act provided it with:

It also assigned it with the following agencies:
The Commissioners of National Education in Ireland.
The Intermediate Education Board for Ireland.
The Commissioners of Education in Ireland (Endowed Schools).
The Inspector of Reformatory and Industrial Schools.
The Department of Agriculture and Technical Instruction for Ireland (business and functions relating to Technical Instruction only).
The College of Science.
The Geological Survey in Ireland.
The National Museum of Science and Art.
The National Library of Ireland.
The National Gallery of Ireland.
The Metropolitan School of Art.
Meteorological Services.

In the early years of the state, the main focus was on running the National School primary system. Free secondary education was provided from 1968. The department also had the task of overseeing reformatory and industrial schools from 1922. The Commission to Inquire into Child Abuse, which reported in 2009 (the "Ryan Report"), found that this was rarely achieved.

The department's headquarters were situated within the grounds of Tyrone House, Dublin in what was formerly the home of the National Education Commissioners.

Alteration of name and transfer of functions
The name and functions of the department have changed by means of statutory instruments.

External links
Department of Education

References

 
Education
Educational administration
Ireland
Education in the Republic of Ireland
Science and technology in the Republic of Ireland
Ministries established in 1921
1921 establishments in Ireland